Augusto Valli (22 May 1867 – 1945)  was an Italian painter, in a Realist style. His journeys to Africa influenced his choice of subject matter and he painted African themes with vibrant colours.

Life and career
Augusto Valli was born in Modena on 22 May 1867 into a family of modest means. He enrolled in 1879 at the Royal Institute of Fine Arts in Modena under Antonio Simonazzi and Ferdinando Manzini completing his studies at the age of 18 years. There he attended the Corso Comune until 1881–1882 and the Corso Speciale of painting from 1882 to 1884.

In 1885, he travelled to Africa. In 1896, he was part of an expedition to Abyssinia and Ethiopia with the Count Gian Pietro. He was detained in Harar by the British Consulate. He escaped a massacre of the Italian mission by the rebels of the Emir Abdallah. In all, he returned three times to East Africa. He last journey was in 1890-91 where he served as a court painter at the Royal Court of Melenik of Ethiopia. He returned from these voyages with many folders of sketches, some of which were purchased by the Geographic Congress of Rome and are now in the museum of  La Società Geografica Italiana.

He illustrated a book (1942) about African (Ethiopian) travels by the colonist Conte Augusto Salimbeni, where he was described as a pittore africanista. For years, he painted for the church of San Giovanni Battista, Spilamberto.

Work

Valli worked in watercolours and in oils. He also illustrated several books. His style was often impressionistic and with touches of colour.

Select list of works
 Semiramide Dying on Ninu's Grave, 1893
  Leggenda della morte di Semiramide
 Ritratto Di Donna Africana
 Ritratto Di Nubiana
 The Good Samaritan
African Landscape

See also

 List of Orientalist artists
 Orientalism

References

1867 births
1945 deaths
19th-century Italian painters
20th-century Italian painters
20th-century Italian male artists
Italian genre painters
Italian male painters
Painters from Modena
Orientalist painters
19th-century Italian male artists